Crematogaster armandi is a species of ant in tribe Crematogastrini. It was described by Forel in 1921.

References

armandi
Insects described in 1921